Balthasar's Odyssey is a 2000 novel by Amin Maalouf set in 17th century Europe and the Levant. Originally written in French, it was shortlisted for the International Dublin Literary Award in 2004.

The plot concerns the journey of a Genoese librarian living in the town of Gibelet (Byblos in Lebanon) named Balthasar who seeks a sacred book The Hundredth Name that is said to contain the unknown and sacred name of God, whose knowledge seems to be the answer for the salvation of souls at Doomsday in the apocalyptic year of 1666. During his trip, Balthasar travels through the Ottoman Empire, to Italy, and London, while experiencing a myriad of problems due to the accursed book.

Plot

Before the dawn of the apocalyptic 'Year of the Beast' in 1666, Balthasar Embriaco, a Levantine merchant, sets out on an adventure that will take him across the breadth of the civilised world from Constantinople, through the Mediterranean, to London, shortly before the Great Fire.

Balthazar's urgent quest is to track down a copy of one of the rarest and most coveted books ever printed, a volume called The Hundredth Name; its contents are thought to be of vital importance to the future of the world. There are ninety-nine names for God in the Koran, and merely to know this most secret hundredth name will, Balthasar believes, ensure his salvation.

2000 French novels
French-language novels
Historical novels
Novels by Amin Maalouf
Novels set in the Ottoman Empire
Novels set in the 1660s